Hans Abramson (5 May 1930 – 9 June 2012) was a Swedish film director. He directed more than 40 films between 1957 and 1991.

Selected filmography
 Ormen (1966)
 Stimulantia (1967)
 Roseanna (1967)
 Tintomara (1970)

References

External links

1930 births
2012 deaths
Swedish film directors
Artists from Stockholm